Vassilis Tsabropoulos is a Greek pianist, conductor, and composer.

As a concert pianist, he has taken the stage with Europe's several important orchestras including, among others, the Philharmonia Orchestra, the Stockholm Philharmonic, the Baltimore Symphony Orchestra, the Czech Philharmonic, the Royal concert Phihlarmonic orchestra, Budapest Chamber Orchestrate, Sofia Philharmonic, Italy Radio Orchestra etc. A highlight is his performances with London Philharmonia and Czech Philharmonic Orchestra under the baton of Vladimir Ashkenazy in piano concertos of Beethoven and Rachmanninof. In October 2019, continuing his long devotion to the great classics, he performed two of the most demanding piano concertos, Beethoven's famous Emperor piano concerto and Mozart's concerto No. 20,  appearing both as a soloist and as conductor of the Royal Philharmonic Orchestra of London.

He has made his first USA tour in October 2004 with a significant critical and popular success

His initial training was in classical music and as a prodigy was winning the UNISEF Competition. Vladimir Ashkenazy quotes: «Vassilis Tsabropoulos possesses rare talent». He studied at National Conservatory of Athens and at the age of fifteen, he graduated with honours and received a scholarship from Alexandro's Onassis Foundation. He continued to study at the Paris Conservatory, the International Music Academy of Salzburg and the Juilliard School. He studied under the tutelage of Rudolf Serkin and Tatiana Nikolayeva.

His first piano solo ECM album Akroasis, mentioned by "The Independent" writer Andrew Clarke as: "The effects are hypnotic and mysterious, shimmering like ancient mosaic". A reviewer of his album Melos commented that "Tsabropoulos' compositions have a static beauty and drama [... that draw] their inspiration from Greek folk music and Byzantine hymns". JazzTimes magazine called the album The Triangle a combination of jazz, tango, and classical music. Arild Adersen also commented: "What struck me straight away was the fact that his exceptional classical technique never got in the way of his jazz feeling".

The "Times" reviewer Mike Bradley, commented that: "Athenian pianist Vassilis Tsabropoulos is one of those rare musicians who is equally at home in both the classical and jazz worlds. His album Achirana demonstrates that, while noted principally for his prowess as a classical pianist, conductor and composer, he also has much to say in a jazz idiom. Accompanied by Norwegian bassist Arild Andersen and British veteran drummer John Marshall, he has assembled an exquisite record filled with fluid, fluent improvisations, which transport and delight. Sample the fearlessly slow gems "Diamond Cut Diamond" and "Valley" and be amazed". 

He collaborated also with the german cellist Anja Lechner, performing classic repertoire and his compositions. Also, he has formed a piano duet with the pianist Vovka Ashkenazy playing concerts in France, Iceland and Greece.

Since 2013, he has formed a duet with the acclaimed performer of byzantine sacred music Nektaria Karantzi, in an artistic combination inspired by byzantine hymns and traditional greek music. Their music unites in a  harmonious way the  West and East tradition and has travelled in Europe several times.

Tsabropoulos is Honorary President of the Sergei Rachmaninov Greek Society and the Music Director and Principal Conductor of the Metropolitan Symphony Orchestra of Athens.

Discography
 Skyscape (1990)
 Images (1992)
 Mussorgsky: Pictures at an Exhibition (1997)
 Achirana, with Arild Andersen and John Marshall (ECM, 2000)
 Live in Cremona (2002)
 Akroasis (ECM, 2003)
 The Triangle, with Arild Andersen and John Marshall (ECM, 2004)
 Chants, Hymns and Dances, with Anja Lechner (ECM, 2004)
 Melos, with Anja Lechner and U.T. Gandhi (ECM, 2008)
 The Promise (ECM, 2009)
 Eleison, with Nektaria Karantzi (MSO, 2016)
 Tsabropoulos in concert (MSO 2017 - piano works of Beethoven and Schumann)

References

External links
Official site
Official site archived

1967 births
Living people
20th-century conductors (music)
20th-century Greek musicians
20th-century male musicians
21st-century classical pianists
21st-century conductors (music)
21st-century Greek musicians
21st-century male musicians
Greek classical composers
Greek classical pianists
Greek conductors (music)
Greek jazz musicians
Greek jazz pianists
Male classical composers
Male jazz musicians
Male classical pianists
ECM Records artists
Musicians from Athens